This is a complete list of episodes of the American police drama New York Undercover, which originally aired on the Fox network from September 8, 1994, to February 11, 1999, through 4 seasons with 89 episodes produced. The episode number reflects the order in which they were aired, which sometimes differed from the order of filming.

Series overview

Episodes
Throughout the first three seasons, episodes regularly featured musical guests performing at Natalie's, a nightclub whose original owner was portrayed by Gladys Knight in Season 1.

Season 1 (1994–95)

Season 2 (1995–96)

Season 3 (1996–97)

Season 4 (1998–99)
Major cast and plot changes were made to the series at the beginning of season 4. Jonathan LaPaglia and Michael DeLorenzo departed at the end of the prior season (leading to the shooting death of Det. Tommy McNamara and the bombing death of Det. Eddie Torres), Patti D'Arbanville-Quinn was dropped from the cast (resulting in the departure of Lt. Virginia Cooper), and Malik Yoba and Lauren Velez's characters were reassigned to a new unit, with new co-workers. Consequently, the nightclub Natalie's was eliminated as a regular setting, and the weekly musical guest appearances came to an end. As a result of all these changes, ratings for the show dramatically dropped forcing Fox to cancel the series, leaving the series finale "Catharsis" unaired until the series entered syndication in 1998; the episode aired on February 11, 1999.

References

External links
 
 New York Undercover episode list at Epguides

Lists of American crime drama television series episodes